Enoplomischus is a genus of African jumping spiders that was first described by L. Giltay in 1931.  it contains only two species, found only in Africa: E. ghesquierei and E. spinosus. They have a large spike-like process on its pedicel that probably mimics a similar spike present in the anterior part of the abdomen of Odontomachus ants that these spiders seem to be modeled after.

References

Salticidae
Salticidae genera
Spiders of Africa